Choi Min-woo (born January 17, 1985), better known by his stage name Choi Sung-won, is a South Korean actor. He started gaining recognition through his role as Sung No-eul in the Korean drama Reply 1988 (2015), a third installment of the Reply series by tvN.

On January 18, 2022, it was confirmed that Choi recently decided to join Wide S Company.

Personal life
In May 2016, Choi was diagnosed with acute leukemia. In order to focus on his recovery his agency stated that he decided to leave the drama Mirror of the Witch. In February 2017, it was revealed that his condition is continuously improving and that he will return through a stage play entitled Miracles of the Namiya General Store. In July 2017, his agency revealed that he is completely healed.

Filmography

Film

Television series

Television programs

Theater

Musicals

Plays

References

External links
 

1985 births
Living people
21st-century South Korean male actors
South Korean male stage actors
South Korean male musical theatre actors
South Korean male film actors
South Korean male television actors
Kookmin University alumni
Place of birth missing (living people)